"Angels Go Bald:Too" is a 1997 song by Howie B. It made #36 on the UK Singles Chart. A music video, directed by Run Wrake, was produced for the single.

Critical reception
Electronicmusic.com complimented the song for containing "a delightful fluffy groove that NEVER gets soppy" and compared it to "taking a bath in scented motor oil".

References

1997 singles
1997 songs
Polydor Records singles